Nahima Lanjri (born 17 February 1968 in Borgerhout) is a Belgian politician and a member of the CD&V. She is of Moroccan descent. She was elected as a member of the Belgian Senate in 2007.

Notes

Living people
1968 births
Christian Democratic and Flemish politicians
Members of the Belgian Federal Parliament
Belgian people of Moroccan descent
21st-century Belgian politicians
21st-century Belgian women politicians
People from Borgerhout